Wendell State Forest is a Massachusetts state forest located in the town of Wendell. The  parcel occupies a forested and hilly upland plateau south of the Millers River and west of the Quabbin Reservoir. Park roads were developed by the Civilian Conservation Corps in the 1930s.

Activities and amenities
Ponds: The day-use area at  Ruggles Pond offers swimming, fishing and a picnic area. The southern end of Ruggles Pond has beaver activities, while the northern end has human activities. Wickett Pond has a boat ramp at its northern end.
 Trails: Trails are used for walking, hiking, mountain biking, horseback riding, and cross-country skiing. Backcountry camping is available at a lean-to along the Metacomet-Monadnock Trail. 
The forest is also used for hunting (in season) and forest product extraction.

Hidden Valley Memorial Forest

Hidden Valley Memorial Forest is a  "in-holding' within Wendell State Forest owned by the Mount Grace Land Conservation Trust.  It was donated in 1996 to the Mount Grace Land Conservation Trust by the Mrs. Mabel Cronquist, widow of noted botanist, author and curator of the New York Botanical Garden Dr. Arthur Cronquist, in his memory.  Hidden Valley was the research camp and vacation home of Dr. Cronquist and his family.

"... there is 
a plaque on a large boulder on 
the trail leading to the property 
which honors Mr. Cronquist. 
All that remains now of the 
homestead that was lived in by 
three generations of the Hunter 
family is a large, fairly intact 
cellar hole in the middle of the 
woods."

Lynne’s Falls, located within the Hidden Valley Memorial Forest parcel, is named after Cronquist’s daughter.

References

External links
Wendell State Forest Department of Conservation and Recreation

Massachusetts state forests
Civilian Conservation Corps in Massachusetts
Parks in Franklin County, Massachusetts